The Abancay Province is one of seven provinces of the Apurímac Region in Peru. The capital of the province is the city of Abancay.

Boundaries
North: Cusco Region
East: Cotabambas Province, Grau Province
South: Aymaraes Province, Antabamba Province, Grau Province
West: Andahuaylas Province, Aymaraes Province

Geography 
One of the highest mountains of the province is Ampay located in the Ampay National Sanctuary. Other mountains are listed below:

Political division
Abancay Province is divided into nine districts, which are:

Ethnic groups 
The province is inhabited by indigenous citizens of Quechua descent. Spanish is the language which the majority of the population (51.47%) learnt to speak in childhood, 48.06% of the residents started speaking using the Quechua language and 0.21% using Aymara (2007 Peru Census).

See also 
 Inka Raqay
 Qiwllaqucha
 Qurimarka
 Q'illu Q'asa
 Usnu Muqu
 Usphaqucha
 Wask'aqucha

References

Abancay Province